Iroquois is a city on the border of Beadle and Kingsbury counties in South Dakota, United States. The population was 292 at the 2020 census. The school building (kindergarten - twelfth grade) is located in Kingsbury County, while the school parking lot is located in Beadle County. Highway 14 runs directly through Iroquois.



History
Iroquois was laid out in 1880. The city was named after the Iroquois people. A post office called Iroquois has been in operation since 1880.

Geography
Iroquois is located at  (44.366437, -97.850095).

Iroquois has been assigned the ZIP code 57353 and the FIPS place code 32020.

Demographics

2010 census
As of the census of 2010, there were 266 people, 119 households, and 76 families residing in the city. The racial makeup of the city was 98.5% White and 1.5% from two or more races. Hispanic or Latino of any race were 0.4% of the population.

There were 119 households, of which 25.2% had children under the age of 18 living with them, 54.6% were married couples living together, 5.0% had a female householder with no husband present, 4.2% had a male householder with no wife present, and 36.1% were non-families. 32.8% of all households were made up of individuals, and 13.5% had someone living alone who was 65 years of age or older. The average household size was 2.24 and the average family size was 2.86.

The median age in the city was 40.6 years. 21.8% of residents were under the age of 18; 6.4% were between the ages of 18 and 24; 25.9% were from 25 to 44; 31.2% were from 45 to 64; and 14.7% were 65 years of age or older. The gender makeup of the city was 52.3% male and 47.7% female.

2000 census
As of the census of 2000, there were 278 people, 113 households, and 77 families residing in the city. The population density was 521.0 people per square mile (202.5/km2). There were 121 housing units at an average density of 226.7 per square mile (88.1/km2). The racial makeup of the city was 95.68% White, 0.36% Native American, 0.36% Asian, 1.44% from other races, and 2.16% from two or more races. Hispanic or Latino of any race were 2.52% of the population.

There were 113 households, out of which 31.9% had children under the age of 18 living with them, 56.6% were married couples living together, 10.6% had a female householder with no husband present, and 31.0% were non-families. 31.0% of all households were made up of individuals, and 11.5% had someone living alone who was 65 years of age or older. The average household size was 2.46 and the average family size was 3.06.

In the city, the population was spread out, with 28.4% under the age of 18, 6.1% from 18 to 24, 28.8% from 25 to 44, 16.9% from 45 to 64, and 19.8% who were 65 years of age or older. The median age was 37 years. For every 100 females, there were 85.3 males. For every 100 females age 18 and over, there were 93.2 males.

The median income for a household in the city was $25,625, and the median income for a family was $36,250. Males had a median income of $25,417 versus $16,806 for females. The per capita income for the city was $13,277. About 18.8% of families and 17.4% of the population were below the poverty line, including 24.7% of those under the age of eighteen and 9.8% of those 65 or over.

See also
 List of cities in South Dakota

References

External links

 

Cities in South Dakota
Cities in Beadle County, South Dakota
Cities in Kingsbury County, South Dakota
1880 establishments in Dakota Territory
Populated places established in 1880